Laura Allen is an American make-up artist. She was nominated for an Academy Award in the category Best Makeup and Hairstyling for the film Emma.

Selected filmography 
 Emma (2020; co-nominated with Marese Langan and Claudia Stolze)

References

External links 

Living people
Year of birth missing (living people)
Place of birth missing (living people)
American make-up artists